Mohammad Arzandeh (born 30 October 1987 in Borujen) is an Iranian long jumper. He competed in the long jump event at the 2012 Summer Olympics.

Competition record

References

Iranian long jumpers
1987 births
Living people
Olympic athletes of Iran
Athletes (track and field) at the 2012 Summer Olympics
Athletes (track and field) at the 2016 Summer Olympics
Athletes (track and field) at the 2006 Asian Games
Athletes (track and field) at the 2014 Asian Games
Male long jumpers
Iranian male athletes
Asian Games competitors for Iran
Islamic Solidarity Games competitors for Iran